Leptopterna is a genus of plant bugs in the Miridae family.

List of species
 Leptopterna albescens (Reuter, 1891)
 Leptopterna amoena Uhler, 1872
 Leptopterna dentifera Linnavuori, 1970
 Leptopterna dolabrata (Linnaeus, 1758)
 Leptopterna emeljanovi Vinokurov, 1982
 Leptopterna euxina Vinokurov, 1982
 Leptopterna ferrugata (Fallén, 1807)
 Leptopterna griesheimae Wagner, 1952
 Leptopterna pilosa Reuter, 1880

Former species
 Leptopterna silacea Bliven 1973 junior synonym of Leptopterna amoena Uhler, 1872

References

Miridae genera
Stenodemini